Breton most often refers to:
anything associated with Brittany, and generally
Breton people
Breton language, a Southwestern  Brittonic Celtic language of the Indo-European language family, spoken in Brittany  
Breton (horse), a breed
Galette or Breton galette or crêpe, a thin buckwheat flour pancake popular in Brittany
Breton (hat) headgear with upturned brim, said to be based on designs once worn by Breton agricultural workers

Breton may also refer to:
Breton (surname)
Breton (band), a South London-based music group
Breton (Elder Scrolls), a race in The Elder Scrolls game series who are descendants of men and Elves
Breton, an alternative name for these wine grapes:
Cabernet Franc
Béquignol noir
Breton (company)
Breton, Alberta, village in Alberta, Canada

See also
Bretonne, 2010 album by Nolwenn Leroy
Briton (disambiguation)
Brereton (disambiguation)
Bretton (disambiguation)

Language and nationality disambiguation pages

pl:Rasy z serii gier The Elder Scrolls#Breton